Danthonia is a genus of Eurasian, North African, and American plants in the grass family. Members of this genus are sometimes referred to as oatgrass, but that common name is not restricted to this genus. Other common names include heathgrass  and wallaby grass.
Australian species have since been reclassified into the genus Rytidosperma.

 Species
 Danthonia alpina Vest – central + southern Europe; Ukraine, Turkey, Caucasus
 Danthonia annableae P.M.Peterson & Rúgolo – Bolivia, Argentina
 Danthonia araucana Phil. – Chile
 Danthonia boliviensis Renvoize – Bolivia
 Danthonia × breviaristata (Beck) Vierh – France, Italy, Austria, Czech Rep, Romania
 Danthonia breviseta Hack. – Rio de Janeiro
 Danthonia californica Bol. – BC ALB SAS WA OR CA NV ID UT MT WY SD CO AZ NM; Chile
 Danthonia cernua Döll – Brazil
 Danthonia chaseana Conert – Minas Gerais
 Danthonia chiapasensis Davidse – Chiapas
 Danthonia chilensis É.Desv. – Argentina, Chile incl Juan Fernández Is
 Danthonia cirrata Hack. & Arechav. – Bolivia, Brazil, Argentina, Uruguay
 Danthonia compressa Austin – mountain oatgrass, flattened oatgrass, slender oatgrass – eastern North America from Georgia to Nova Scotia + Ontario
 Danthonia decumbens (L.) DC. – common heath grass – Europe, North Africa, Turkey, Caucasus
 Danthonia domingensis Hack. & Pilg. – Hispaniola, Jamaica
 Danthonia holm-nielsenii Laegaard – Ecuador
 Danthonia intermedia Vasey – timber oatgrass, intermediate oatgrass – western United States, Canada, Russian Far East
 Danthonia malacantha (Steud.) Pilg. – Chile incl Juan Fernández Is
 Danthonia melanathera (Hack.) Bernardello – Argentina
 Danthonia montevidensis Hack. & Arechav. – Brazil, Argentina, Uruguay
 Danthonia parryi Scribn. – ALB SAS CO MT WY  NM
 Danthonia rhizomata Swallen – Brazil, Uruguay
 Danthonia rugoloana Sulekic – Salta
 Danthonia secundiflora J.Presl  – from Mexico to Uruguay
 Danthonia sericea Nutt. – eastern + central United States
 Danthonia spicata (L.) Roem. & Schult. – poverty oatgrass, poverty grass – from Alaska + Greenland to Veracruz
 Danthonia unispicata (Thurb.) Munro ex Macoun – onespike oatgrass – ALB BC SAS WA ID MT OR WY SD UT NV CA

 Formerly included
A number of species which were formerly classified under Danthonia are now included in Amphibromus, Astrebla, Chionochloa, Joycea, Karroochloa, Monachather,  Merxmuellera, Notodanthonia, Pentaschistis, Plinthanthesis, Rytidosperma or Schismus.

References

 
Poaceae genera